The Pennsylvania Provincial Council helped govern the Province of Pennsylvania from 1682 to 1776. The provincial council was based on the English parliamentary system and namely the Upper House or House of Lords. From the Frame of Government of Pennsylvania of 1683, the provincial council consisted of 18 to 72 members from the province's counties. The council had the power to dismiss the General Assembly, rule in the absence of the Governor or Lieutenant Governor, create courts, and make judicial appointments.

Meeting places
Before 1753, the Council and Assembly met at various places such as Quaker meeting houses or private residences in Philadelphia. In the first government meeting on October 28, 1682 took place in Chester, Pennsylvania. After 1753 the government met at what is now Independence Hall.

See also
Colonial government in America
General Assembly of the Province of Pennsylvania

References

External links
Pennsylvania State Archives

Colonial government in America
Province of Pennsylvania
1682 establishments in Pennsylvania
1776 disestablishments in the United States